Dig It! is a jazz album by The Red Garland Quintet, recorded in 1957 and 1958 but not released on the Prestige label as PRLP 7229 until 1962.

Reception
Harvey Pekar wrote in the December 6, 1962 issue of DownBeat magazine: "This Lp is another in the series of excellent informal sessions Garland and Coltrane made for Prestige in the late '50s."

Track listing
"Billie's Bounce" (Charlie Parker) – 9:24
"Crazy Rhythm" (Irving Caesar, Joseph Meyer, Roger Wolfe Kahn) – 3:26
"CTA" (Jimmy Heath) – 4:42 also already issued on Taylor's Wailers
"Lazy Mae" (Garland) – 16:06

Personnel
Red Garland – piano
John Coltrane – tenor saxophone (tracks 1, 3, 4)
Donald Byrd – trumpet (1, 4)
George Joyner – bass (1, 3, 4)
Paul Chambers – bass (2)
Art Taylor – drums

References 

1962 albums
Red Garland albums
John Coltrane albums
Prestige Records albums
Albums produced by Bob Weinstock
Albums recorded at Van Gelder Studio